Iwo Zaniewski (born 22 May 1956 in Warsaw, Poland) is a Polish painter, photographer, director and artistic director of Przybora Zaniewski Ltd (PZL), an advertising agency.

Education
From 1976 to 1981 Zaniewski studied at the Warsaw Academy of Fine Arts. Until the mid-1980s he was active solely as a painter but later began creative work in commercials and photography.

Painting
As a painter, Zaniewski works mostly in oils and drawing media. His themes usually centre on scenes from everyday life while his earlier works are still lives, nudes and the occasional landscape. Despite changes in convention as to the portrayal of reality over subsequent periods the characteristic feature of Zaniewski's paintings has remained essentially that of composition. His use of composition rests upon an arrangement of forms wherein every potential alteration would give rise to a breakdown of cohesive construction and a deterioration of harmony. As such, his paintings are not readily ascribed to any one particular requisite trend in the history of contemporary art. The key to Zaniewski's work is not its context or its being a public medium, rather a visual sensitivity in seeing comprehensively.

Advertising career
Zaniewski's first commercial projects were for the Spanish advertising agency Bassat, Ogilvy & Mather in Barcelona. Thereafter, his first Polish commercials were for ITI Agency. From 1992 to 1999 he was artistic director of the Grey Agency in Warsaw. He created advertising campaigns for brands such as Knorr, Frugo, Okocim, Radio Zet, Lucky Strike, and Malma. In 1999, along with Kot Przybora he founded the Przybora Zaniewski Ltd advertising agency (PLZ) where he is now both artistic director and a commercial director. PZL has created advertising campaigns for Frugo, Dębowe Mocne, Żubr, Redds, Orlen, Tetley, Olej Kujawski, Manuel, Simplus, and the longest-running Polish advertising campaign for brand name Plus.

Exhibitions
Zaniewski has exhibited actively since 1980. His most significant exhibitions and awards include:
 Wahl Gallery, Warsaw 1981;
 1984 Grand Prix at the 23rd Joan Miró Foundation International Competition, Barcelona;
 Galeria Narodowa Zachęta (collective exhibition), Warsaw 1985;
 Art Basel, Basle 1985;
 Japan International Artists Society (collective exhibition) Tokyo 1985;
 SARP Gallery, Warsaw 1989;
 Inny Świat Gallery, Kraków, 1990;
Major Retrospective Exhibition at the National Museum in Kraków (held at the Arsenal building), under the patronage of Waldemar Dąbrowski, Polish Minister for Art and Culture, 2005;
 1st Place in the National Geographic photographic competition, Warsaw 2005;
 Today Art Museum, Beijing 2008;
 All Gallery, Beijing 2008;
 International Art Fair, Shanghai 2008;
 Wilson Art Center, Shanghai 2008;
 Levant Gallery, Shanghai 2008;
 Sunshine Museum, Beijing (inaugural collective exhibition), Beijing 2008;
 CANART - Institute of Contemporary Art (inaugural collective exhibition), Shanghai 2008.

References

Photographers from Warsaw
20th-century Polish painters
20th-century Polish male artists
21st-century Polish painters
21st-century male artists
1956 births
Living people
Academy of Fine Arts in Warsaw alumni
Polish male painters